Johanna Kristina "Hanna" Grönvall (10 December 1879 in Västra Sallerup, Malmöhus län – 22 May 1953) was a Swedish politician (social democrat) and trade union worker.

Grönwall worked as a maid from 1900 to 1934. In 1933, she became a member of the committee founded to examine the working conditions of domestics, and in 1934, she became deputy chairman of the trade union for domestics, Stockholms hembiträdesförening. She was the founder of the Central Comitté of Domestics, Hembiträdesföreningarnas centralkommitté, in 1936. Grönwall was a member of the city council of Stockholm Municipality for the social democrats.

Sources
 Sveriges dödbok 1947–2006, (Cd-Rom), Sveriges Släktforskarförbund

1879 births
1953 deaths
People from Eslöv Municipality
Swedish Social Democratic Party politicians
Maids
Swedish domestic workers
20th-century Swedish women politicians
20th-century Swedish politicians